Onwentsia Club is an 18-hole golf course in the central United States, located in Lake Forest, Illinois, a suburb north of Chicago.

Course history
Charles B. Macdonald designed the first nine holes in 1895; the second nine was designed in 1898 by Herbert J. Tweedie, James Foulis and Robert Foulis. The course was subsequently redesigned by Tom Doak.

In 1906, the club secured the services of the great Willie Anderson who had been pro at The Apawamis Club. Anderson remains the only golfer to win 3 consecutive US Opens.

1906 U.S. Open
Onwentsia Club hosted the U.S. Open  in 1906, won by Alex Smith.

Tom Doak redesign
The club has panoramic views of the property at almost all points, and the Doak redesign keeps the integrity of some holes intact. The fescue and multi-tiered putting surfaces compensate for length on this gem. The name "Onwentsia” meant a meeting place - in the country - of sporting braves and squaws.

References

External links

Golf clubs and courses in Illinois
Golf clubs and courses designed by Charles B. Macdonald
Buildings and structures in Lake County, Illinois
Lake Forest, Illinois